Günther Rücker (February 2, 1924 - February 24, 2008) was a German writer, playwright and film director. Rücker won several awards for his work, including the National Prize of the GDR and the Prix Italia.

Rücker was born at Reichenberg (Liberec), and studied at the Theaterhochschule Leipzig. He was a Stasi informer after 1978. He died in Meiningen, aged 84.

Selected filmography 
 First Spaceship on Venus (1959)
 Der Fall Gleiwitz (1961)
 Die besten Jahre (1965)
 Her Third (1971)
 Bis daß der Tod euch scheidet (1978), Grand Prix at the Karlovy Vary International Film Festival and First Prize at the Sydney Film Festival
 The Fiancee (1979)

References

External links

1924 births
2008 deaths
Theaterhochschule Leipzig alumni
Writers from Liberec
German Bohemian people
East German writers
German film directors
Recipients of the Patriotic Order of Merit
Recipients of the National Prize of East Germany
Recipients of the Heinrich Greif Prize
German male dramatists and playwrights
20th-century German dramatists and playwrights
20th-century German male writers
German male screenwriters
People of the Stasi
Recipients of the Medal of Merit of the GDR
20th-century German screenwriters
Sudeten German people